Veronica Lesley "Bonny" Barry (born 30 January 1960) is an Australian politician. She was a  Labor member of the Legislative Assembly of Queensland from 2001 to 2009, representing the district of Aspley.

Barry was first elected to parliament at the 2001 state election when she defeated incumbent Liberal MP John Goss. Barry served as Labor caucus chair during her eight years in parliament, and also as a parliamentary secretary from September 2006. Seeking a fourth term at the 2009 state election, she was defeated by Liberal National candidate Tracy Davis.

Barry was born in the Queensland town of Blackall. She is married, with one daughter and three sons. She is a registered nurse with over twenty years experience. Barry has recently successfully recovered from cancer.

References

1960 births
Living people
Australian Labor Party members of the Parliament of Queensland
Members of the Queensland Legislative Assembly
21st-century Australian politicians
21st-century Australian women politicians
Women members of the Queensland Legislative Assembly